West Nile sub-region, previously known as West Nile Province and West Nile District, is a sub-region in north-western Uganda, in the  Northern Region of Uganda.

Location
The sub-region is bordered by the Democratic Republic of the Congo to the south and west, by South Sudan to the north and by the Albert Nile to the east. The town of Arua, is the largest town in the sub-region.

Overview
West Nile sub-region consists of the following districts, as of July 1st 2021:

 Adjumani District
 Arua City
 Arua District
 Koboko District
 Maracha District
 Terego District
 Madi-Okollo District
 Moyo District
 Nebbi District
 Yumbe District
 Zombo District
 Obongi District

The sub-region received its name from being located on the western side of the Albert Nile. Military leader and former president of Uganda, Idi Amin, first gained prominence in the West Nile region before staging a military coup and usurping Milton Obote in 1971.

Energy
As of May 2019, West Nile is supplied by the 3.5 megawatts Nyagak Hydroelectric Power Station, located at Nyapea, Zombo District. This is boosted by the newly-installed 4.6 megawatt Yumbe Thermal Power Station, operated by Electromaxx. Another 8 megawatts thermal installation is expected in June 2019.

Meantime, construction of the 6.6 megawatts Nyagak III Hydroelectric Power Station, is ongoing, with commissioning expected in 2022. With 16 megawatts to the sub-region now, the current power shortage can be mitigated until the national grid connections arrive in the next 2 to 3 years. Electromaxx has received authorization to transfer 12.6 megawatts of its installation at Tororo to West Nile, to alleviate the acute power shortage there.

See also
 WENRECO
 West Nile virus

References

External links
 Profile of West Nile Sub-region
Map of West Nile Sub-region, Northern Region, Uganda
 

 
Sub-regions of Uganda
Northern Region, Uganda